Enterographa is a genus of lichens in the family Roccellaceae.

Species

, Species Fungorum accepts 62 species of Enterographa.
Enterographa albopunctata 
Enterographa aldabrensis 
Enterographa bagliettoae 
Enterographa bella 
Enterographa bengalensis 
Enterographa bradleyana  – United States
Enterographa brezhonega 
Enterographa caudata  – United States
Enterographa chiodectonoides 
Enterographa compunctula 
Enterographa confusa 
Enterographa crassa 
Enterographa cretacea  – Australia
Enterographa deslooveri  – Papua New Guinea
Enterographa diederichiana  – Zambia
Enterographa divergens 
Enterographa elaborata 
Enterographa elixii 
Enterographa epigraphis 
Enterographa epiphylla 
Enterographa falcata 
Enterographa fellhaneroides 
Enterographa glaucotremoides 
Enterographa hainanensis 
Enterographa hutchinsiae 
Enterographa incognita 
Enterographa inthanonensis 
Enterographa johnsoniae 
Enterographa kalbii 
Enterographa keylargoensis 
Enterographa kinabaluensis  – Kota Kinabalu
Enterographa lecanoracea 
Enterographa lichexanthonica 
Enterographa lueckingii 
Enterographa meklitiae 
Enterographa membranacea 
Enterographa micrographa 
Enterographa multilocularis 
Enterographa murrayana  – United States
Enterographa nicobarica  – India
Enterographa nitidula  – United States
Enterographa oregonensis 
Enterographa osagensis 
Enterographa pallidella 
Enterographa paruimae 
Enterographa perez-higaredae 
Enterographa pertusarioides 
Enterographa pitardii 
Enterographa punctata 
Enterographa rotundata 
Enterographa seawardii 
Enterographa serusiauxii 
Enterographa seychellensis 
Enterographa sipmanii 
Enterographa sorediata 
Enterographa subcervina 
Enterographa subgelatinosa 
Enterographa subquassiicola 
Enterographa tanzanica 
Enterographa tropica 
Enterographa vezdae 
Enterographa wijesundarae  – Sri Lanka
Enterographa zephyri 
Enterographa zonata

References

Cited literature

Roccellaceae
Arthoniomycetes genera
Lichen genera
Taxa described in 1825
Taxa named by Antoine Laurent Apollinaire Fée